Ellen Niit (born Ellen Hiob; Ellen Niit since 1958) (13 July 1928 – 30 May 2016) was an Estonian children's writer, poet and translator. Over her lifetime, she penned more than forty books of both prose and poetry for children. She also wrote a number of collections of prose and poetry for adults. Her works have been translated into eighteen languages.

Biography 
Ellen Hiob was born in 1928 in Tallinn, Estonia. She attended school in Tapa and in Tallinn, then graduated from the University of Tartu in the field of Estonian philology in 1952. After working as a poetry consultant at the Writers' Union of the ESSR from 1956 to 1961, she was forced to resign for ideological reasons. Afterward, Niit worked as an editor of children's television programmes, and in 1963 became a freelance translator and writer.

Hiob first married folklorist and literary scholar Heldur Niit in 1949. They had one son, noted psychologist Toomas Niit, in 1953. The couple divorced in 1958, the same year she wed writer Jaan Kross; their children are Maarja Undusk (born 1959), Eerik-Niiles Kross (born 1967) and Märten Kross (1970).

Selected works

Poetry books

 Kuidas leiti nääripuu (Finding the Christmas Tree), Eesti Riiklik Kirjastus 1954; Mixi kirjastus 2000; Tammerraamat 2013
 Rongisõit (The Train Ride), Eesti Riiklik Kirjastus 1957; Tammerraamat, 2013
 Karud saavad aru (The Bears Will Understand), Eesti Raamat 1967, 1971, 1972; Eesti Päevaleht 2010
 Lahtiste uste päev (Open Door Day), Eesti Raamat 1970
 Suur maalritöö (Colouring the World), Eesti Raamat 1971, 1985; Elmatar 2008; Tammerraamat 2015; A Film Eesti & Tammerraamat 2014
 Midrimaa (Wonderland), Eesti Raamat 1974
 Krõlli-raamat (The Book of Krõll), Eesti Raamat 1979
 Oma olemine, turteltulemine (One's Own Beings and Comings), Eesti Raamat 1979
 Filmikrõll (Nippet), Perioodika 1980
 Suur suislepapuu (A Huge Apple Tree), Eesti Raamat 1983
 Meil maal (At Our Farm), Eesti Raamat 1985
 Tere, tere, lambatall! (Hello There, Little Lamb!), 1993
 Kuidas Krõll tahtis põrandat pesta (How Krõll Tried to Mop the Floor), 1993
 Krõlli pannkoogitegu (Krõll Makes Pancakes), Elmatar 1995
 Ühel viivul vikervalgel (At a Rainbow-Light Moment), Tiritamm 1999
 Kaelasall päkapikule (A Scarf for a Dwarf), Huma 2000
 Veel ja veel. Krõlliga maal ja veel (More and More. On Land and Water with Krõll), Elmatar 2002
 Taeva võti: luulet lastele 1954–2008 (The Key of Heaven), Tammerraamat 2012
 Mänguvesi (Playing With Water), Tammerraamat 2013

Prose

 Pille-Riini lood (Pille-Riin's Stories), Eesti Riiklik Kirjastus 1963; Eesti Raamat 1971; Tiritam, 2003; TEA Kirjastus 2008, 2013; Tammerraamat 2013
 Jutt jänesepojast, kes ei tahtnud magama jääda (The Story of the Bunny Who Didn't Want to Fall Asleep), Eesti Raamat 1967, 1970; Tiritamm 2007; Tammerraamat 2018
 Triinu ja Taavi jutud (Stories about Triinu and Taavi), Eesti Raamat 1970
 Triinu ja Taavi uued ja vanad lood (Triinu's and Taavi's New and Old Tales), Eesti Raamat 1977; TEA Kirjastus 2007, 2013, Tammerraamat 2017
 Ott kosmoses (Ott's Adventures in Space), Perioodika 1979
 Jänesepoja õhtu koos isaga (The Little Bunny's Night with Father), Perioodika 1982
 Onu Ööbiku ööpäev (Mr. Nightingale's Twenty-Four Hours), Tiritamm 1998
 Onu Ööbik Öösorri tänavast (Mr. Nightingale from Nightjar Street), Tammerraamat 2017

Awards and honors

 1971 Juhan Smuul Annual Prize of Literature (Open Door Day)
 1977 Honored Writer of the Estonian SSR
 1978 Juhan Smuul Annual Prize of Literature (Triinu ja Taavi uued ja vanad lood)
 1994 Karl Eduard Sööt Children's Poetry Award (Hello There, Little Lamb!, How Krõll Tried to Mop the Floor)
 1996 IBBY Honour List (Krõll Makes Pancakes)
 1999 Annual Children's Literature Award of the Cultural Endowment of Estonia (At a Rainbow-Light Moment)
 1999 Order of the White Star, III Class
 2005 Lifetime achievement award from the E. W. Ponkala Fund for furthering cultural relations between Finland, Estonia, and Hungary
 2009 Estonian State Cultural Award
 2010 Tallinn Coat of Arms Badge
 2004–2009 Astrid Lindgren Memorial Award candidate
 2018 The White Ravens (Mr. Nightingale from Nightjar Street)

References 

1928 births
2016 deaths
Estonian children's writers
Estonian women children's writers
Estonian women poets
Estonian translators
20th-century Estonian women writers
21st-century Estonian women writers
University of Tartu alumni
Writers from Tallinn
Recipients of the Order of the White Star, 3rd Class
Burials at Rahumäe Cemetery
20th-century translators